The Hag's Tooth, at  high, is a sharp rock spike which is the 193rd highest peak in Ireland on the Vandeleur-Lynam scale. It is also known as Stumpeenadaff.  The Hag's Tooth is situated in the Hag's Glen beside the Eagle's Nest corrie of Carrauntoohil, and is part of the MacGillycuddy's Reeks in Kerry.

Geography 

The Hag's Tooth is a distinctive triangular rock feature encountered when walking through the Hag's Glen on the way to climbing Carrauntoohil , Ireland's highest mountain, via the classic Devil's Ladder route.  The Hag's Tooth rock is described as "remarkably unstable".

The steep and narrow rocky ridge from the Hag's Tooth up to the summit of Beenkeragh, is referred to as the Hag's Tooth Ridge (see photo opposite).

Climbing 
The route to the Hag's Tooth follows the same path to access the Heavenly Gates gully of Carrauntoohil (the Heavenly Gates are sometimes used as an alternative descent route to the Devil's Ladder from the summit of Carrauntoohil), and also to access the dramatic deep corrie at the base of Carrauntoohil's north-east face, known as the Eagle's Nest area. The Eagle's Nest corrie consists of three distinct levels, with the top level containing Lough Cummeenoughter, Ireland's highest lake.

The narrow rocky ridge from the Hag's Tooth up to the summit of Beenkeragh, the Hag's Tooth Ridge, is regarded for its scrambling, and for its views into the Eagle's Nest area and the major gullies of Carrauntoohil's north-east face.  The route also enables loop to be completed by continuing across the infamous Beenkeragh Ridge to Carrauntoohil, and then descending via the Heavenly Gates, back into the Hag's Glen.  However, it is also a dangerous route and has been the scene of accidents.

See also 

 Lists of mountains in Ireland
 List of mountains of the British Isles by height
 List of Furth mountains in the British Isles

References

External links
MountainViews: The Irish Mountain Website
MountainViews: Irish Online Mountain Database
The Database of British and Irish Hills , the largest database of British Isles mountains ("DoBIH")
Hill Bagging UK & Ireland, the searchable interface for the DoBIH
Ordnance Survey Ireland ("OSI") Online Map Viewer
Logainm: Placenames Database of Ireland

Mountains and hills of County Kerry
Furths
Mountains under 1000 metres